Laanshøj is a small town located in the Furesø Municipality, in the Capital Region of Denmark.

References

Cities and towns in the Capital Region of Denmark
Egedal Municipality